Talheim is a municipality in the district of Tuttlingen in Baden-Württemberg in Germany.

People 
 Max Schneckenburger (1819-1849), German poet

References

Tuttlingen (district)
Württemberg